Gladiator (Music From The Motion Picture) is the original soundtrack of Rowdy Herrington's 1992 film Gladiator. It was released on February 25, 1992 through Columbia Records and consisted of a blend of rock, hip hop, and pop music. The soundtrack failed to make the Billboard charts, but Warrant's remake of "We Will Rock You" made it to 83 on the Billboard Hot 100. The title track was performed by the hip hop group 3rd Bass in what was the group's final appearance together.

Track listing

References

External links

1992 soundtrack albums
Hip hop soundtracks
Columbia Records soundtracks
Albums produced by Easy Mo Bee
Albums recorded at Chung King Studios
Drama film soundtracks